Matangini Hazra (19 October 1870 – 29 September 1942) was an Indian revolutionary who participated in the Indian independence movement until she was shot dead by the British Indian police in front of the Tamluk Police Station (of erstwhile Midnapore District) on 29 September 1942. She was affectionately known as Gandhi buri, Bengali for old lady Gandhi.

Early life and involvement in the freedom movement
Not much is known of her early life apart from that she was born in the small village of Hogla, near Tamluk in 1869, and that because she was the daughter of a poor peasant, she did not receive a formal education. She was married early (at the age of 12) and became widowed at the age of eighteen without bearing any offspring.

She became actively interested in the Indian independence movement as a Gandhian. A notable feature of the freedom struggle in Midnapore was the participation of women. In 1930, she took part in the Civil Disobedience movement and was arrested for breaking the Salt Act. She was promptly released, but then participated in the 'Chowkidari Tax Bandha' (abolition of chowkidari tax) movement and while marching towards the court building chanting slogan to protest against the illegal constitution of a court by the governor to punish those who participated in the movement, Matangini was arrested again. She was sentenced to six months imprisonment and sent to Baharampur jail. Again, she was incarcerated for six months at Baharampur.  After being released, she became an active member of the Indian National Congress and took to spinning her own Khadi. In 1933, she attended the subdivisional Congress conference at Serampore and was injured in the ensuing baton charge by the police.

Social work 
In 1930s, despite her meager physical state, Hazra went back to her social work immediately after her release from prison to help untouchables. Always engaged in humanitarian causes, she worked among affected men, women and children when smallpox in epidemic form broke out in the region.

Involvement in the Quit India Movement
As part of the Quit India Movement, members of the Congress planned to take over the various police stations of Medinipore district and other government offices. This was to be a step in overthrowing the British government in the district and establishing an independent Indian state. Hazra, who was 72 years at the time, led a procession of six thousand supporters, mostly women volunteers, with the purpose of taking over the Tamluk police station. When the procession reached the outskirts of the town, they were ordered to disband under Section 144 of the Indian Penal Code by the Crown police. As she stepped forward, Hazra was shot once. Apparently, she had stepped forward and appealed to the police not to open fire at the crowd.

The Biplabi newspaper of the parallel Tamluk National Government commented:

As she was repeatedly shot, she kept chanting Vande Mataram, "hail to the Motherland". She died with the Indian national flag held high and still flying.

Legacy

The parallel Tamluk government incited open rebellion by praising her "martyrdom for her country" and was able to function for two more years, until it was disbanded in 1944, at Gandhi's request.

India earned Independence in 1947 and numerous schools, colonies, and streets, including the long stretch of Hazra Road in Kolkata, were named after  Hazra. The first statue of a woman put up in Kolkata, in independent India, was Hazra's in 1977.
A statue now stands at the spot where she was killed in Tamluk.
In 2002, as part of a series of postage stamps commemorating sixty years of the Quit India Movement and the formation of the Tamluk National Government, the Department of Posts of India issued a five rupee postage stamp with Matangini Hazra's portrait. In 2015, the Shahid Matangini Hazra Government College for Women was established in Tamluk, Purba Medinipur, after this very well-known revolutionary figure.

See also 
Sahid Matangini (community development block)
Sahid Matangini railway station

References

1870 births
1942 deaths
Bengali Hindus
20th-century Bengalis
Revolutionary movement for Indian independence
Indian revolutionaries
People from Purba Medinipur district
Indian women activists
Activists from West Bengal
Women from West Bengal
19th-century Indian women
19th-century Indian people
20th-century Indian women
20th-century Indian people
Women Indian independence activists
Revolutionaries from West Bengal
Indian independence activists from West Bengal
People from Tamluk